Drumohar is a village in Nevestino Municipality, Kyustendil Province, south-western Bulgaria.

There is one shop and one house to stay in.

References

Villages in Kyustendil Province